Flyvista was a Georgian low cost carrier headquartered in Tbilisi with its base at Tbilisi International Airport.  The company slogan was For those who travel.

History
Flyvista began operations on 5 August 2014, with their first flight to Tehran-Imam Khomeini. In May 2015, Flyvista ceased all operations due to a decreasing number of passengers. Reasons given were the cancellation of visas on arrival in Tbilisi by the government and the lack of passengers on the important Tbilisi-Kyiv route due to the Ukraine crisis.

Destinations

As of May 2015, prior to its demise Flyvista served the following destinations:

References

Defunct airlines of Georgia (country)
Companies based in Tbilisi
Airlines established in 2014
Airlines disestablished in 2015
2014 establishments in Georgia (country)
2015 disestablishments in Georgia (country)